The 1950 USC Trojans football team represented the University of Southern California (USC) in the 1950 college football season. In their ninth year under head coach Jeff Cravath, the Trojans compiled a 2–5–2 record (1–3–2 against conference opponents), finished in seventh place in the Pacific Coast Conference, and were outscored by their opponents by a combined total of 182 to 114.

Wilbur Robertson led the team in passing with 50 of 106 passes completed for 492 yards, one touchdown and eight interceptions. Al Carmichael led the team in rushing with 103 carries for 514 yards and two touchdowns. Harold Hatford was the leading receiver with 22 catches for 192 yards and one touchdown.

Three Trojans received honors from the Associated Press (AP), United Press (UP), or conference coaches on the 1950 All-Pacific Coast Conference football team: Johnny Williams, USC (Coaches-1 [defensive back]); Volney Peters, USC (AP-1 [defensive tackle]; Coaches-1 [offensive and defensive tackle]; UP-1); and Paul McMurtry, USC (Coaches-1 [guard]).

Schedule

Coaching staff
 Head coach: Jeff Cravath
 Assistant coaches: Ray George (line coach), Roy "Bullet" Baker (backfield coach), Sam Barry (head scout), Bill Fisk (end coach), Walter Hargesheimer (backfield coach), Mike Milligan (line coach), Harry Smith (freshman coach)

Roster
HB #16 Frank Gifford, Jr.

References

USC
USC Trojans football seasons
USC Trojans football